Air Force Aid Society (AFAS) is a non-profit, charitable organization that is the official charity of the United States Air Force.  The organization is headquartered in Arlington, Virginia.

Mission
The three-pronged charter supports the Air Force mission by 
 providing worldwide emergency assistance to members and their families, 
 sponsoring educational assistance programs, and 
 offering base community programs that improve Airman/family welfare.
 
As of early 2015, AFAS was paying for a staff of 21 people, all at its headquarters in Arlington, Virginia.

Thanks to investment income and operational leverage, each $1 of donations from airmen is complemented by $2 from other sources.

References

External links 
Official AFAS site

Charities based in Virginia
United States military support organizations